A geomorphosite, or geomorphological heritage site, is a landform or an assemblage of landforms that have a scientific, educational, historic-cultural, aesthetic or socio-economic value.

Geomorphosites are included among the geoheritage sites (geosites) and may comprise landforms (or sites of former landforms) that have been hidden or destroyed due to human activities, as well as anthropogenic landforms of archaeological or historical interest.

The value of a geomorphosite, for purposes of analysis, comparison and protection, can be qualitatively assessed using several methods. Some of these methods are based only on expert judgements and a few evaluation criteria, while others involve assigning a qualitative score to each relevant characteristic of a site (e.g. its scientific importance, educational value etc.) and then weighting and summing (or ranking) the scores to obtain the site's overall value (or rank).

References

Further reading 

 Geographica Elvetica 62(3) (2007) 
 Geomorphologie 11(3) (2005) 
 Reynard E, Coratza P, Regolini – Bissig G (edd., 2009) Geomorphosites. Verlag Dr. Friedrich Pfeil, München

Tourism
Geography